Academic grading in Pakistan is based on a percentage system.

Lower secondary education 
Lower secondary education contains the Grade 6 to Grade 10 classes.

Grading Formula
45
Grading of Division

WES – World Education Services

Upper secondary education 
Upper secondary education includes the grades 11 and 12th classes. The exam are held by Boards of Intermediate and Secondary Education (BISE).

Higher education 

Higher education includes Bachelor degrees, Master degrees and Doctoral degrees.

References 

Pakistan
Grading
Grading